The Spanish order of precedence is currently prescribed by Royal Decree 2099/1983. The decree establishes the order of precedence of national official activities as well as common regulations to activities organised by municipalities, autonomous communities and other public institutions. The general order established by the decree is modified if the event takes place in the capital, Madrid, instead of elsewhere in Spain.

Order of precedence in Madrid 
 The King (as the monarch)
 The members of the royal family
 The Queen (as the consort)
 The Princess of Asturias (as the heir presumptive)
 Infanta Sofia (as daughter of the reigning king)
 The former monarch and consort
 King Juan Carlos
 Queen Sofia
 The infantes of Spain in order of succession rights
 The Duchess of Lugo
 Infanta Cristina of Spain
 The Duchess of Hernani and Soria
 The President of the Government (prime minister) - Pedro Sánchez
 The President of the Congress of Deputies - Meritxell Batet
 The President of the Senate - Ander Gil
 The President of the Constitutional Court - Juan José González Rivas
 The President of the General Council of the Judiciary (Rafael Mozo Muelas, acting) and of the Supreme Court (Francisco Marín Castán, acting)
 The vice presidents of the Government
 The First Vice President of the Government and Minister of Economy and Enterprise - Nadia Calviño
The Second Vice President of the Government and Minister of Labor and Social Economy - Yolanda Díaz
The Third Vice President of the Government and Minister for the Ecological Transition and Demographic Challenge - Teresa Ribera
 Ministers of the Cabinet
 The Minister of Foreign Affairs, European Union and Cooperation -  José Manuel Albares
 The Minister of Justice - Pilar Llop
 The Minister of Defence - Margarita Robles
 The Minister of Finance and Civil Service - María Jesús Montero
 The Minister of the Interior - Fernando Grande-Marlaska
 The Minister of Transports, Mobility and Urban Agenda - Raquel Sánchez
 The Minister of Education and Vocational Training - Pilar Alegría
 The Minister of Labor and Social Economy -(Currently held by the Second Vicepresident)
 The Minister of Industry, Trade and Tourism - María Reyes Maroto
 The Minister of Agriculture, Fisheries and Food - Luis Planas
 The Minister of the Presidency, Relationships with the Cortes and Democratic Memory - Félix Bolaños
 The Minister of Territorial Policy and Spokesperson of the Government -Isabel Rodríguez
 The Minister of Ecological Transition and the Demographic Challenge (Currently held by the Third Vicepresident)
The Minister of Economy and Enterprise - (Currently held by the First Vicepresident)
The Minister of Health - Carolina Darias
The Minister of Science and Innovation - Diana Morant
The Minister of Equality - Irene Montero
The Minister of Social Rights and 2030 Agenda - Ione Belarra
The Minister of Consumer Affairs - Alberto Garzón
The Minister of Inclusion, Social Security and Migrations - José Luis Escrivá
The Minister of Universities - Joan Subirats
 The Dean of the Diplomatic Corps - The Apostolic Nuncio (Bernardito Auza)
 Ambassadors accredited to Spain
 Former prime ministers by order of tenure
 Felipe González
 José María Aznar
 José Luis Rodríguez Zapatero
 Mariano Rajoy
 The presidents of the Autonomous communities of Spain, in order of creation
 The Lehendakari - Iñigo Urkullu
 The President of the Government of Catalonia - Pere Aragonès
 The President of the Regional Government of Galicia - Alberto Núñez Feijóo
 The President of the Regional Government of Andalusia - Juan Manuel Moreno
 The President of Asturias - Adrián Barbón
 The President of Cantabria - Miguel Ángel Revilla
 The President of La Rioja - Concha Andreu
 The President of the Region of Murcia - Fernando López Miras
 The President of the Valencian Government - Ximo Puig
 The President of Aragón - Javier Lambán
 The President of Castile-La Mancha - Emiliano García-Page
 The President of the Canary Islands - Ángel Víctor Torres
 The President of Navarre - María Chivite
 The President of Extremadura - Guillermo Fernández Vara
 The President of the Balearic Islands - Francina Armengol
 The President of the Community of Madrid - Isabel Díaz Ayuso
 The President of Castile and León - Alfonso Fernández Mañueco
 The Mayor-President of Ceuta - Juan Jesús Vivas
 The Mayor-President of Melilla - Eduardo de Castro
 The Leader of the Opposition - Pablo Casado
 The Mayor of Madrid - José Luis Martínez-Almeida
 The Head of the Royal Household of His Majesty the King
 The President of the Council of State
 The President of Court of Accounts
 The Attorney General of the State
 The Ombudsman
 Secretaries of State and assimilated personnel according to the precedence of their ministries
 The Chief of the Defense Staff
 The Chief of Staff of the Army - Army General Amador Fernando Enseñat y Berea
 The Admiral Chief of the Naval Staff - Admiral Antonio Martorell Lacave
 The Chief of Staff of the Air Force - Air General Javier Salto
 Vice-presidents of the Congress of Deputies and the Senate
 The Chairman of the Supreme Council of Military Justice
 The Government's Delegate in Madrid
 The Deputy Inspector General of the First Military Region
 The Chief of the Central Jurisdiction of the Navy
 The Chief of the First Air Region
 The Secretary-General of the Royal House of His Majesty the King
 The Head of the Military Chamber of the Royal House of His Majesty the King
 Under-secretaries and assimilated personnel according to the precedence of their ministries
 The President of the Madrid Assembly - Eugenia Carballedo
 Foreign Chargé d'affaires accredited to Spain
 The President of the Instituto de España
 The Chief of Protocol of the State (Director of Protocol of the Presidency of the Government)
 Directors-general and assimilated personnel
 Ministers of the Madrid Regional Government
 Members of the Bureau of the Madrid Assembly
 The President of the Madrid High Court of Justice
 The Chief Prosecutor of the Madrid High Court of Justice
 Deputies and Senators for Madrid
 The Rector of the Complutense University of Madrid (UCM) - Joaquín Goyache
 The Rector of the Autonomous University of Madrid (UAM) - Rafael Garesse
 The Rector of the Technical University of Madrid (UPM) - Guillermo Cisneros
 The Rector of the National University for Distance Education (UNED) - Ricardo Mairal
 The Rector of the University of Alcalá - José Vicente Saz
 The Rector of the Carlos III University (UC3M) - Juan Romo
 The Rector of the Rey Juan Carlos University (URJC) - Javier Ramos
 Deputy mayors of Madrid

Order of Precedence when not in Madrid

The King
The Queen
The Princess of Asturias
The infantes of Spain
The President of the Government
The President of the Congress of Deputies
The President of the Senate
The Chairperson of the Constitutional Court
The Chairperson of the General Council of the Judiciary Power
The First Vice president (if applicable)
The Second Vice President (if applicable)
The president of the Autonomous Community where the event is taking place
Ministers of the government according to the order before mentioned.
Dean of the Diplomatic Corps
Foreign ambassadors accredited to Spain
Former prime ministers
Presidents of other Autonomous Communities according to the order before mentioned
Leaders of the Opposition
President of the Community's Legislature
The Government's Delegate to the Autonomous Community where the event is taking place
The Mayor of the Place
The Chief of the House of the King
The Chairman of the Council of State
The Chairman of the Auditor Court
The Attorney General
The Ombudsman
Secretaries of State and assimilate personnel
The Chief of Staff of The Defence
The Chief of Staff of the Army
The Admiral Chief of Staff of the Navy
The Chief of Staff of the Air Force
Vice-presidents of the Congress and the Senate
Chairman of the Supreme Council of Military Justice
Captain General of the Military Region
General Commander of the Naval Zone
Lieutenant General of the Aerial Zone
Commander General of the Fleet
The Chief of the Military Quarter and Secretary General of the House of the King
Ministers of the Autonomous Community's Government
Members of the Bureau of the Community's Legislature
The Chairman of the Community's High Court
The Chief Prosecutor of the High Court
Under Secretaries and Assimilated Personnel
Secretaries of the Congress of Deputies and the Senate
Foreign Chargé d'affaires accredited to Spain
The President of the Instituto de España
The National Chief of Protocol
Deputy Government's delegate of the province (where applicable)
The President of The Provincial Deputation or Insular Council (where applicable)
Directors Generals and assimilated personnel
Deputies and Senators for the province
Rectors of the Universities of the University District where the event is taking place, by order of establishment
The Insular Government's Delegate (only in Canary and Balearic Islands)
The Chairman of the Provincial Court
The Military Governor
The Chief of the Naval Sector
The Chief of the Air Sector
Lieutenant Mayors of the Place
Military Commanders
Foreign Consuls

Order of Preference of Spanish Institutions in Madrid
The Crown
The Government of Spain
The Diplomatic Corps accredited to Spain
The Bureau of the Congress of Deputies
The Bureau of the Senate
The Constitutional Court
The General Council of the Judiciary Power
The Supreme Court
The Council of State
The Auditor Court
The Office of the President
Ministries attending to the above order
The Instituto de España and the Royal Academies
The Community of Madrid Executive Council
The Madrid Assembly
The Madrid High Court of Justice
The Madrid City Council
The Universities

Order of Precedence of Spanish Institutions when not in Madrid

The Crown
The Government of Spain
The Diplomatic Corps accredited to Spain
The Autonomic Executive Council
The Bureau of the Congress of Deputies
The Bureau of the Senate
The Constitutional Court
The General Council of the Judiciary Power
The Supreme Court
The Autonomic Legislature
The Council of State
The Auditor Court
The Regional High Court of Justice
The City or Town Council
The Office of the President
Ministries attending to the above order
Autonomic Ministries
The Instituto de España and the Royal Academies
Spanish Government's office in the Autonomous Community
Provincial Deputation or Insular Council
Provincial Court
The Universities
Foreign Consular Offices

External links
 Royal Decree 2099/1983 (incorporating amendments) BOE.es

Orders of precedence
Government of Spain